Holly Gate, also known as J.H. Joyner House, is a historic home located at Whitsett, Guilford County, North Carolina. It was built in 1908–1910, and is a -story, transitional Queen Anne / Colonial Revival style frame dwelling.  It has a tall hipped roof, three high chimneys, and a wraparound porch.  It was built by James Henry Joyner, a professor at the Whitsett Institute.

It was listed on the National Register of Historic Places in 1980.  It is located in the Whitsett Historic District.

References

Houses on the National Register of Historic Places in North Carolina
Queen Anne architecture in North Carolina
Colonial Revival architecture in North Carolina
Houses completed in 1910
Houses in Guilford County, North Carolina
National Register of Historic Places in Guilford County, North Carolina
Historic district contributing properties in North Carolina